The 2018 Four National Figure Skating Championships included the Czech Republic, Hungary, Poland, and Slovakia. It took place 14–16 December 2017 in Košice, Slovakia.
The results were split by country; the three highest-placing skaters from each country formed their national podiums in men's singles, ladies' singles, and ice dance. The results were among the criteria used to determine international assignments.

Medal summary

Czech Republic

Hungary

Poland

Slovakia

References

Citations

External links
 2018 Four National Figure Skating Championships results

December 2017 sports events in Europe
International figure skating competitions hosted by Slovakia
Four National Figure Skating Championships
Four National Figure Skating Championships
Four National Figure Skating Championships
Four National Figure Skating Championships
Four National Figure Skating Championships
Czech Figure Skating Championships
Slovak Figure Skating Championships
Polish Figure Skating Championships
Hungarian Figure Skating Championships